The Arapuni Suspension Bridge is located just downstream from the Arapuni Power Station on the Waikato River in the South Waikato District of New Zealand. The  suspension bridge in the bush-lined gorge was built in the mid-1920s to allow workers from the village of Arapuni to access the power station construction site.

History

As it was a relatively simple ancillary structure associated with what at the time was New Zealand's largest civil engineering project, the suspension bridge itself received little mention in progress reports and media accounts. Construction started in May 1925 and finished sometime in the three months after April 1926. The bridge does not seem to have had a formal opening function.

The bridge connected "top camp" (which eventually became the Arapuni township) with the western side of the gorge. "Top camp" accommodated the workmen employed on construction of the spillway, powerhouse and penstock.

The bridge was registered a Category II historic place by the Historic Places Trust on 21 April 1994.

Engineering

The bridge was designed by David Rowell & Co. from Westminster, London. The structure is likely to have been shipped prefabricated from England, and was erected by the British contractors for the Arapuni dam and power station project, Armstrong Whitworth. It is one of the longest suspension footbridges in the country. It has a high steel lattice tower on the true left. On the true right, the bridge footing is cut into the side of the river bank and the foundation for the suspension cables is built on top of the cliff.

Today
The bridge is a popular tourist destination. The site can be accessed via a walkway starting on Arapuni Road opposite Rabone Street.

Bridge users are rewarded with views of the scenic gorge. Geological features can be seen, and the cliffs on the true right of the landing are of volcanic origin and formed by ignimbrite blocks, which are vertically fissured by cooling stresses.

The bridge is sometimes incorrectly called the Arapuni Swing Bridge, for example on signs along the walkway to the bridge. The term 'swing bridge' is in popular use in New Zealand for suspension bridges that act as footbridges.

The Waikato River Trails, which is under construction as part of the New Zealand Cycle Trail, will pass the bridge on the true right of the Waikato River.

References

External links
 New Zealand Historic Places Trust

Suspension bridges in New Zealand
Heritage New Zealand Category 2 historic places in Waikato
Bridges completed in 1926
Bridges over the Waikato River
Bridges in Waikato
Tourist attractions in Waikato
1926 establishments in New Zealand
1920s architecture in New Zealand